The 2018 Wakefield Metropolitan Borough Council election took place on 3 May 2018 to elect members of Wakefield Metropolitan District Council in England. The election was held on the same day as other local elections. The Labour Party and the Conservative Party fielded a full slate of 21 candidates, as well as 12 Liberal Democrats, 6 Yorkshire Party candidates, 4 Green Party candidates, 3 UK Independence Party candidates, 1 Trade Unionist and Socialist Coalition candidate and 1 Democrats and Veteran's Party candidate.

Council make-up 
The make up of the Council following the election was:

Summary 

 
 +/- compared with Wakefield Council election 2016.

Results by ward 
Changes compared to 2014.

Farmer was first elected as a UKIP Councillor for Ossett in 2014, but resigned his membership in 2017 and later joined the Conservatives.

Harrison stood as Labour candidate for South Elmsall and South Kirby in 2014.

References

External links
Candidates by ward Wakefield Metropolitan District Council

2018
2018 English local elections